Roio del Sangro is a village and comune of the province of Chieti in the Abruzzo region of central Italy.

Notes and references

Cities and towns in Abruzzo